"Paradise" is the only single release from Styx's 1997 live double album Return to Paradise.  The song was originally written and recorded by Dennis DeYoung for his musical The Hunchback of Notre Dame.  The song was re-recorded by Styx for inclusion as one of three new studio tracks on the live album.

It was released only to radio stations and not commercially, charting at No. 27 on the Billboard  Adult Contemporary chart. It is, to date, the last Styx song to chart on any Billboard singles chart.

Personnel
Dennis DeYoung - lead vocals, keyboards
Tommy Shaw - lead guitar, backing vocals
James Young - rhythm guitar, backing vocals
Chuck Panozzo - bass 
Todd Sucherman - drums

1997 singles
Styx (band) songs
Songs written by Dennis DeYoung
1990s ballads